Clare Valley may refer to:

South Australia
Clare Valley 
Clare Valley Aerodrome 
Clare Valley Racecourse
Clare Valley wine region

Elsewhere
Clare Valley, Saint Vincent and the Grenadines, a town in  Saint Vincent

See also
Clare (disambiguation)